Solmissus, or dinner plate jellyfish, is a genus of hydrozoans. Its species are unique among cnidarians in that they actively hunt for prey as opposed to passively waiting for plankton to pass by. They are found in the deep waters of Monterey Bay, California. They are most likely to be found in the deep sea, mid water. They grow to be  in diameter. These hydrozoans feed on gelatinous zooplankton, including salps and doliolids, ctenophores, jellyfish, and copepods. However, Solmissus may be limited to feeding on soft-bodied prey by the type of nematocysts on their tentacles (Mills).

Species list
The genus Solmissus contains the following species:
 Solmissus albescens (Gegenbaur, 1857)
 Solmissus incisa (Fewkes, 1886)
 Solmissus marshalli Agassiz & Mayer, 1902

Invalid species
 Solmissus atlantica Zamponi, 1983 [taxon inquirendum] 
 Solmissus bleekii Haeckel, 1879 [taxon inquirendum] 
 Solmissus faberi Haeckel, 1879 [taxon inquirendum]

References

Mills, C. E. (november 1988). In Situ Observations of the Behavior of Mesopelagic Solmissus Narcomedusae (Cnidaria, Hydrozoa)Cla. Volume 43, Number 3, Pp. 739-751. Retrieved March 03, 2021, from https://www.ingentaconnect.com/content/umrsmas/bullmar/1988/00000043/00000003/art00030

Cuninidae
Hydrozoan genera
Bioluminescent cnidarians